Matthew Ho Kwong-pui (born 3 August 1988) is a Hong Kong actor and television presenter contracted to TVB. He had asthma when he was young. 

Ho won the Most Improved Male Artiste award at the 2018 TVB Anniversary Awards.

Early life
Matthew Ho was born on 3 August 1988 in Hong Kong and attended St. Stephen's College in Stanley, Hong Kong until the age of 14, Form 3, when he and his family immigrated to San Francisco, California. After attending Foothill College in Los Altos Hills, California, he transferred to a California State University and graduated with a bachelor's degree in accounting. Half a year after his graduation, Ho returned to Hong Kong and became a DJ for the internet radio station, 9DTV. In 2012, he graduated from TVB's 26th artiste training class, and officially signed with the company.

Career
After working as background actors in several TVB dramas, Ho first received attention for his role as the teen version of Lawrence Ng's character in 2014 the drama Never Dance Alone. 

In 2016, Ho garnered more attention  with his performance in the legal drama Law dis-Order. He gained recognition by winning the Best TVB New Artiste award at the 2016 StarHub TVB Awards. 

In 2017, Ho won the Most Improved Artiste awards at both the StarHub TVB Awards and TVB Star Awards Malaysia. At the 2017 TVB Anniversary Awards, he won the Most Popular Onscreen Partnership award with Edwin Siu and Raymond Cho with their collaboration in the drama A General, a Scholar and a Eunuch.

In 2018, Ho garnered his first Best Actor nomination with the drama Life on the Line and won the Most Improved Male Artiste award at the 2018 TVB Anniversary Awards.

Filmography

Awards and nominations

StarHub TVB Awards

TVB Star Awards Malaysia

TVB Anniversary Awards

People's Choice Television Awards

References

External links
 
 
 
 

1988 births
Living people
21st-century Hong Kong male actors
Hong Kong male television actors